The Battle of Zaoyang–Yichang, also known as the Battle of Zaoyi, was one of the 22 major engagements between the National Revolutionary Army and Imperial Japanese Army during the Second Sino-Japanese War.

Background
The Japanese were seeking a quicker solution to achieve a Chinese surrender. The Japanese contemplated moving directly down the Yangtze to the relocated Chinese capital, Chongqing. To do so, they would need to capture a critical town in western Hubei province, Yichang.

The Japanese attack did not commit many troops or material, which enabled the main Chinese commander, Li Zongren, who had frustrated the Japanese before, to repel the Japanese.

Battle
On 1 May 1940, three divisions of the IJA 11th Army under command of General Waichiro Sonobe  began a drive towards Zaoyang. They pushed towards the 5th warzone's strongholds in the Tongbaishan and Dahongshan mountains,  attempting to encircle and destroy the Chinese 31st Army Group under General Tang Enbo in a pincer movement. The Chinese strategy aimed to let the Japanese forces run low on supplies, and then counterattack, as had been successfully employed at the Battle of Changsha. When the Japanese managed to outmaneuver Tang's forces, General Zhang Zizhong marched to his aid with the Chinese 33rd Army Group. The Japanese forces rallied and pushed back the Chinese, and General Zhang Zizhong was cut down in a burst of machine gun fire when he refused to retreat from the front lines. He was the most senior Chinese commander to be killed in combat during the war.

The Japanese used chemical weapons against Chinese forces who lacked chemical weapons in order to compensate for when they were numerically inferior, whenever Chinese were defeating the Japanese in hand to hand combat. The Japanese did not dare to use gas against the Americans because the Americans had their own chemical weapons stockpile and the Japanese feared retaliation.

The Japanese launched gas attacks against Chinese when the Chinese were defeated and overwhelming the Japanese in hand to hand combat, like at the battle of Yichang in 1941 where Japanese ground forces in the city were routed by Chinese soldiers but the Japanese deployed mustard gas to win the battle.

Aftermath
According to Japanese records, the Japanese casualties were 2,700 troops killed and 7,800 wounded. Chinese records show that 11,000 Japanese troops were killed. While the Chinese 5th War Area arguably made tactically sound decisions in its battle plans, it was ultimately overwhelmed by the sheer firepower of the Japanese combined arms offensive, relying primarily on small arms to face the onslaught of Japanese air, naval, artillery, and armoured striking power. As the Chinese commanders had surmised, the Japanese forces were overextended, and were not in a position to pursue their victory. However, the Imperial Japanese Navy pushed strongly for the occupation of Yichang, located at the edge of Sichuan Province and connecting the 5th and 9th war zones. The Navy felt that it was critically needed as a forward base for air attacks against Chongqing. After considerable argument, the Japanese Army agreed to occupy Yichang. This dealt a considerable blow to the morale and fighting capacity of the Chinese as no large-scale offensive was mounted after this operation.

See also
 Order of Battle: Battle of Zaoyang-Yichang

References

Sources
 Hsu Long-hsuen and Chang Ming-kai, History of The Sino-Japanese War (1937–1945) 2nd Ed., 1971. Translated by Wen Ha-hsiung, Chung Wu Publishing; 33, 140th Lane, Tung-hwa Street, Taipei, Taiwan Republic of China. Page 334-339, Map 20, 21
 van de Ven, Hans. War and Nationalism in China: 1925-1945,

External links
 "Occupation of Shashi", Nippon News, No. 3. in the official website of NHK.
 "Occupation of Yichang", Nippon News, No. 4. in the official website of NHK.

Conflicts in 1940
Zaoyang-Yichang 1939
1940 in China
1940 in Japan
Military history of Hubei
May 1940 events
June 1940 events